Enzo Garinei (4 May 1926 – 25 August 2022) was an Italian film actor. He appeared in nearly 80 films since 1949. He was also a professional voice artist, best remembered as the Italian voice of Sherman Hemsley in the American sitcom The Jeffersons. He was the brother of playwright Pietro Garinei.

Garinei died on 25 August 2022, at the age of 96.

Selected filmography

 Totò Le Mokò (1949)
 Little Lady (1949)
 Bluebeard's Six Wives (1950)
 The Cadets of Gascony (1950)
 Toto Looks for a Wife (1950)
 Accidents to the Taxes!! (1951)
 Toto the Third Man (1951)
 Five Paupers in an Automobile (1952)
 Funniest Show on Earth (1953)
 Two Nights with Cleopatra (1953)
 The Doctor of the Mad (1954)
 Le signorine dello 04 (1955)
 Eighteen Year Olds (1955)
 Toto and Carolina (1955)
 A Woman Alone (1956)
 Rascel-Fifì (1957)
 Toto, Peppino and the Fanatics (1958)
 Maid, Thief and Guard (1958)
 Toto in Madrid (1959)
 My Wife's Enemy (1959)
 Il raccomandato di ferro (1959)
 Fountain of Trevi (1960)
 Silver Spoon Set (1960)
 Girl with a Suitcase (1961)
 Shivers in Summer (1963)
 Latin Lovers (1965)
 Soldati e caporali (1965)
 Don Chisciotte and Sancio Panza (1968)
 Let's Have a Riot (1970)
 No, the Case Is Happily Resolved (1973)
 Hospitals: The White Mafia (1973)
 Savage Three (1975)
 La portiera nuda (1976)
 Madly in Love (1981)
 Pierino contro tutti (1981)
 Pierino medico della Saub (1981)
 Banana Joe (1982)
 Il ragazzo di campagna (1984)
 Crime in Formula One (1984)
 Cop in Drag (1984)
 Roba da ricchi (1987)
 Rimini Rimini - Un anno dopo (1988)

References

External links

 

1926 births
2022 deaths
20th-century Italian male actors
21st-century Italian people
Italian male film actors
Italian male television actors
Italian male stage actors
Italian male voice actors
Male actors from Rome

Burials at Campo Verano